North Bangor is a hamlet in Franklin County, New York, United States. North Bangor has a post office with ZIP code 12966.

References

Hamlets in Franklin County, New York
Hamlets in New York (state)